Žlibinai eldership is an eldership in Plungė District Municipality to the east from Plungė. The administrative center is Žlibinai.

Largest villages
Kantaučiai 
Žlibinai 
Keturakiai 
Purvaičiai 
Kapsūdžiai

Other villages

References

Elderships in Plungė District Municipality